James Stenhouse (born 14 August 1919, date of death unknown) was a Scottish professional footballer who played as a right half or inside right.

In a career interrupted by World War II, his clubs included St Mirren and Aberdeen. He had been a Scotland schoolboy international in 1935, and while with St Mirren (where he won the wartime Summer Cup in 1943) he was selected in an unofficial international fixture against England at Wembley in 1944. Stenhouse is deceased.

References

1919 births
Year of death missing
Scottish footballers
People from Kelty
Footballers from Fife
Association football inside forwards
Association football wing halves
Scottish Football League players
Scotland wartime international footballers
Scottish Junior Football Association players
Highland Football League players
Southern Football League players
St Mirren F.C. players
Aberdeen F.C. players
Kettering Town F.C. players
Ross County F.C. players
Stamford A.F.C. players
Ayr United F.C. players
Corby Town F.C. players